Hand & Stone Massage and Facial Spa is a chain of franchised massage spas in the United States founded in 2004 by John Marco. The spa offers various massages including Swedish massage, hot stone massage, couples massage, foot massage and facials.

History
In 2004, former physical therapist John Marco, founded Hand & Stone Massage and Facial Spa in Toms River, New Jersey. By 2007 the company had 3 units each costing between $187,000 and $389,000. In 2008 the company planned on expanding to 14 units with a targeted goal of 100.

In 2014, the company operated 170 units across America and Canada generating annual sales of about $140 million.

In 2015, the store operated 55 spas in 28 states and Canada and grossed over $185 million in sales. In 2016, Carli Lloyd became the franchise's first spokeswoman after signing a two-year deal. In 2017, the company was the second largest massage franchise, behind Massage Envy, operating over 500 locations.

References

External links

Massage
Companies established in 2004
Franchises